Newcastle Higher is a community in Bridgend County Borough, south Wales. Located north west of Bridgend town centre it is made up of the townships of Pen-y-fai and Aberkenfig and straddles the M4 motorway. The community is home to several notable buildings, including the Pen-y-fai Hospital (the former Glamorganshire Lunatic Asylum), Court Coleman and All Saints Church.

At the 2001 census, the community's population was 3,695, increasing to 4,046 at the 2011 Census.

Governance
At the local level the community elects twelve community councillors to Newcastle Higher Community Council, from the community wards of Aberkenfig and Penyfai.

Newcastle Higher was the name of the county electoral ward, electing one county councillor at the 1995 elections to Bridgend County Borough Council. Together with Llangynwyd Lower, Newcastle Higher has been part of the Aberkenfig ward since 1999.

Prior to 1996, Newcastle Higher was a ward (from 1987) to Ogwr Borough Council and, from 1989, to Mid Glamorgan County Council.

References

External links
Map showing the community boundaries of Newcastle Higher

Bridgend
Communities in Bridgend County Borough
Former wards of Bridgend County Borough
Mid Glamorgan electoral wards